

Gustav Wilke (6 March 1898 – 14 March 1977) was a German paratroop general during World War II. He was a recipient of the Knight's Cross of the Iron Cross of Nazi Germany.

Awards
 Knight's Cross of the Iron Cross on 24 May 1940 as Oberstleutnant and Gruppenkommandeur of Kampfgruppe z.b.V. 11

References

Citations

Bibliography

 
 

1898 births
1977 deaths
People from Iława
People from West Prussia
Luftwaffe World War II generals
German Army personnel of World War I
Prussian Army personnel
Recipients of the Knight's Cross of the Iron Cross
German prisoners of war in World War II
Reichswehr personnel
Recipients of the clasp to the Iron Cross, 2nd class
Lieutenant generals of the Luftwaffe